Mill Hill Substation Pastures is a fifteen-hectare Site of Metropolitan Importance for Nature Conservation  in Mill Hill in the London Borough of Barnet.

The reserve consists of pastures grazed by horses around Mill Hill Electricity Substation. These contain patches of unimproved herb-rich pasture on damp clay soil. Locally uncommon plants include devil's bit scabious, sneezewort, pepper-saxifrage and red bartsia. The dividing hedges appear to be very old, and Burtonhole Brook, a tributary of Folly Brook, flows through the site, adding to its diversity of habitat. The hedgerows and woodland provide a refuge for birds.

The reserve is on private land, but it can be viewed from Burtonhole Lane and Partingdale Lane.

See also

 Nature reserves in Barnet

References

Nature reserves in the London Borough of Barnet
Mill Hill